Winger is a city in Polk County, Minnesota, United States. It is part of the Grand Forks, ND-MN Metropolitan Statistical Area. The population was 174 at the 2020 census.

Geography

Demographics

2010 census
As of the census of 2010, there were 220 people, 91 households, and 49 families living in the city. The racial makeup of the city was 96.4% White, 2.3% Native American, 0.5% Asian, and 0.9% from two or more races.

There were 91 households, of which 35.2% had children under the age of 18 living with them, 31.9% were married couples living together, 18.7% had a female householder with no husband present, 3.3% had a male householder with no wife present, and 46.2% were non-families. 42.9% of all households were made up of individuals, and 16.5% had someone living alone who was 65 years of age or older. The average household size was 2.42 and the average family size was 3.41.

The median age in the city was 33.7 years. 31.4% of residents were under the age of 18; 9.8% were between the ages of 18 and 24; 24.1% were from 25 to 44; 20% were from 45 to 64; and 14.5% were 65 years of age or older. The gender makeup of the city was 50.9% male and 49.1% female.

2000 census
As of the census of 2000, there were 205 people, 94 households, and 53 families living in the city. The racial makeup of the city was 93.17% White, 2.44% Native American, and 4.39% from two or more races.

There were 94 households, out of which 30.9% had children under the age of 18 living with them, 41.5% were married couples living together, 12.8% had a female householder with no husband present, and 43.6% were non-families. 41.5% of all households were made up of individuals, and 20.2% had someone living alone who was 65 years of age or older.  The average household size was 2.18 and the average family size was 3.00.

In the city, the population was spread out, with 27.3% under the age of 18, 8.8% from 18 to 24, 23.9% from 25 to 44, 20.0% from 45 to 64, and 20.0% who were 65 years of age or older.  The median age was 34 years. For every 100 females, there were 109.2 males.  For every 100 females age 18 and over, there were 91.0 males.

The median income for a household in the city was $21,146, and the median income for a family was $30,000. Males had a median income of $21,750 versus $20,156 for females. The per capita income for the city was $11,707.  About 13.5% of families and 14.5% of the population were below the poverty line, including 12.1% of those under the age of eighteen and 12.2% of those 65 or over.

Local businesses
Winger has a Farmer's Co-op.  There is also a sales barn located in the city next to Moran's Family Restaurant.  The Grilla Cafe was a noted landmark on Highway 59 in the 1960s, but has since closed.

Depot cafe is on Hwy 59 and is in the building that used to be the Winger train depot in the heart of the town. It's open for breakfast and lunch and there's also a convenience store and off-sale wine and liquor store attached.

Celebrities from Winger
Daniel Revier, a podcaster known for co-hosting "Minnesota Bias" and regularly appearing on "Randomville, ND" proudly boasts to be from Winger.

Vance Kaupang, the acclaimed regular guest on the "Minnesota Bias" podcast is originally from Winger, and still runs his family farm there today.

Footnotes

Further reading
 R.I. Holcombe and William H Bingham, Compendium of History and Biography of Polk County, Minnesota. Minneapolis: W. H. Bingham & Co., 1916.
 Huber D. McLellan, The History of the Early Settlement and Development of Polk County, Minnesota. PhD dissertation. Northwestern University, 1928.
 Polk County Historical Society, Bicentennial History of Polk County, Minnesota: Pioneers of the Valley. n.c.: Polk County Historical Society, 1976.
 Polk County Historical Society, The Polk County Historian. (journal)
 Claude Eugene Wentsel, Polk County, Minnesota, in the World War. Ada, MN: C.E. Wentsel, 1922.
 Winger Golden Jubilee Historical Committee, Golden Jubilee, Winger, Minnesota, 1904-1954.  Winger, MN: Winger Enterprise, n.d. [1954].
 Maxine Workman, Minnesota Cemeteries, Polk County. West Fargo, ND: Red River Genealogy Society, 1988.

Cities in Polk County, Minnesota
Cities in Minnesota